Sam Witt (born 1970) is an American poet and tenured English professor who currently lives in Brookline, Massachusetts.

Life
Born in 1970 in Wimbledon, England. He studied as an undergraduate at the University of Virginia and went on to receive his MFA from the Iowa Writers' Workshop. Everlasting Quail was published in 2010 by the University Press of New England.  Witt went on to spend a year in Russia as a Fulbright Scholar to work on his second book. Witt has taught at the University of California at Berkeley, the University of Iowa, the New England Institute of Art, Saint Petersburg State University, the University of Missouri at Kansas City, and as a creative writing lecturer in the English Department of Harvard University. He was a member of the faculty at Whitman College. He is now a tenured member of the English faculty at Framingham State University and served as Jaded Ibis Press poetry editor until its asset sale in January 2016.

Books and awards

Sam Witt's first book, Everlasting Quail, was selected by judge Carol Frost for the Katharine Bakeless Nason Poetry Prize given by the Bread Loaf Writers' Conference run by Middlebury College. His second book, Sunflower Brother, was awarded the Open Competition from the Cleveland State University Poetry Center and was published in 2006 by Cleveland State University Press.  Witt won the Dana Award for poetry in 2005. Sam Witt's work has been awarded a number of different awards since then, including: the Meridian Editors' Poetry Prize, 2008; the Briar Cliff Review Poetry Prize, 2008 for "Occupation: Dreamland;" and the Cultural Center of Cape Cod National Poetry Award, for "Dirge for the White Birds. . . ." "The Overburden in Hawktime" was chosen by poet Nicky Beer as the winner of the 2012 Pinch Literary Award for Poetry.

Witt's third book of poems, "Little Domesday Clock" was selected for publication in 2017 as a part of the Carolina Wren Press Poetry Series.

Poetry
 Witt, Sam.  (2001). Everlasting Quail. University Press of New England. 
 Witt, Sam. (2007). Sunflower Brother. Cleveland State University Poetry Center. 
 Witt, Sam. (2017). Little Domesday Clock. The Carolina Wren Press Poetry Series.

External links
Jason Stumpf,  instructor in the Department of English at Providence College, published a review of Everlasting Quail in a Spring 2006 web symposium on Contemporary Poetry, at https://web.archive.org/web/20110720030604/http://itdp.providence.edu/Faculty/Stumpf/p_Silva.htm   
Witt's poem 'The Face in a Hospital Bar'
Witt's poem 'Americana'
Review of 'Little Domesday Clock'

Living people
1970 births
American male poets
University of Virginia alumni
Iowa Writers' Workshop alumni
Harvard University staff
Whitman College faculty
Place of birth missing (living people)
British emigrants to the United States
21st-century American poets
21st-century American male writers